The B&M Baked Beans factory is an historic cannery building in Portland, Maine, USA. The building was constructed in 1913 in the East Deering neighborhood by the Burnham & Morrill Company. Baked beans were produced in the building until 2021. The building is a prominent landmark highly visible from Interstate 295. It is located at 1 Beanpot Circle.

History 
The Burnham and Morrill Co. began in 1867 on Franklin Street in Portland as a canning factory for vegetables, meat, and fish. The company constructed the B&M Baked Beans factory in 1913. The factory first produced canned beans in 1927. It used a traditional open-pot baking process with iron cauldrons that weighed 200 pounds attached to a ceiling-mounted rail system. The cauldrons were filled with beans, molasses, and other ingredients on the top floor of the factory and baked for hours. The cooked beans were dumped into a chute and went down to the canning line.

In 2021, owner B&G Foods Inc. announced that the B&M Baked Beans factory would close. In August of that year the company removed the factory's brick smoke stack. 

The closure of the plant moved the production of the baked beans to the midwest. By late 2022, B&M customers were reporting that the baked beans were undercooked, crunchy, and tasted different. Customers speculated that the beans were no longer being baked. Some customers were hoarding B&M bean cans produced at the Portland plant.

Roux Institute 
After its closure, it was sold to Northeastern University, which plans to develop the Roux Institute on the 13.5 acre property. In 2022, it was designated a landmark by the City of Portland. In 2023, the Portland City Council voted to rezone the property from industrial to mixed use and create an institutional overlay zone.

References

Industrial buildings completed in 1913
Industrial buildings and structures in Portland, Maine
1913 establishments in Maine
Canneries